Alexander Wentworth Macdonald, 2nd Baron Macdonald (9 December 1773 – 19 June 1824) was a Scottish peer and Member of Parliament.

Macdonald was the eldest son of Alexander Macdonald, 1st Baron Macdonald of Skye, Scotland, and his wife Elizabeth Diana (née Bosville). He succeeded his father to the barony in 1795 but, as this was an Irish peerage, it did not entitle him to a seat in the British House of Lords. The following year he was instead elected to the House of Commons for Saltash, a seat he held until 1802.

Lord Macdonald died in June 1824, aged 50. He never married and was succeeded in his titles by his younger brother, Godfrey Macdonald, 3rd Baron Macdonald of Sleat.

References

Kidd, Charles, Williamson, David (editors). Debrett's Peerage and Baronetage (1990 edition). New York: St Martin's Press, 1990, 

1773 births
1824 deaths
People from the Isle of Skye
Members of the Parliament of Great Britain for constituencies in Cornwall
British MPs 1796–1800
Members of the Parliament of the United Kingdom for constituencies in Cornwall
UK MPs 1801–1802
UK MPs who inherited peerages
Sleat, Alexander Macdonald, 7th Lord
2